Calleagris hollandi is a butterfly in the family Hesperiidae. It is found in Uganda, western Tanzania, Angola, the Democratic Republic of the Congo (Shaba), northern Zambia and northern Malawi. The habitat consists of moist woodland.

References

Butterflies described in 1897
Tagiadini
Butterflies of Africa
Taxa named by Arthur Gardiner Butler